Construction adhesive is a general-purpose adhesive used for attaching drywall, tile, molding, and fixtures to walls, ceilings, and floors. It is most commonly available in tubes intended for use with a caulking gun.

Properties 
Adhesion to a variety of substrates allows bonding of dissimilar materials if necessary.
High cohesive strength is desirable.
Flexibility improves peel strength by flexing with peel stress.
High elastic modulus of substrate and adhesive resists stress at the bond line.

Composition 
There are multiple chemistries for construction adhesives. Common ingredients include clay, cement, acrylic resin, polyurethane monomers, styrene-butadiene rubber, hexane and other nonpolar solvents, and various initiators and functional additives.

Standards 
ASTM C557 "Standard Specification for Adhesives for Fastening Gypsum Wallboard to Wood Framing" gives requirements for construction adhesives used for attaching wallboard in building construction.

References

External links
Waterproof Adhesives
Asbestos Toxicity: Where Is Asbestos Found?

Adhesives